Mārtiņš Blūms (born 17 October 1995) is a Latvian cross-country mountain biker.

Major results

MTB

2015
 2nd Cross-country, National Championships
2016
 1st  Cross-country, National Championships
2017
 1st  Overall UCI Under-23 XCO World Cup
1st Lenzerheide
1st Mont-Sainte-Anne
2nd Nové Město
2nd Val di Sole
3rd Vallnord
 National Championships
1st  Cross-country marathon
2nd Cross-country, National Championships
2018
 2nd Cross-country, National Championships
2019
 1st  Cross-country, National Championships
 1st Sakarya MTB Cup
 1st Costa Blanca Bike Race
2020
 1st  Cross-country, National Championships
2021
 1st  Cross-country, National Championships
 1st Izomat MTB Cup
 1st Salamina Epic MTB Race
2022
 1st  Cross-country, National Championships

Road
2018
 4th Overall Tour of Black Sea
1st  Points classification
 6th Overall Tour of Cappadocia

References

References
 

1995 births
Living people
Latvian male cyclists
People from Cēsis
Cross-country mountain bikers